Brian Shul (born 1948) is a Vietnam War-era attack pilot and a retired major in the United States Air Force (USAF). He flew 212 combat missions and was shot down near the end of the war. He was so badly burned that he was given next to no chance to live. Surviving, he returned to full flight status, flying the SR-71 Blackbird. Major Shul completed a 20-year career in the Air Force. He has written four books on aviation and runs a photo studio in Marysville, California.

Biography

Brian Shul was born in Quantico, Virginia, on February 8, 1948.  He graduated from Radford High School in Honolulu, Hawaii, in 1966 and from East Carolina University in 1970 with a degree in history.  That same year he joined the Air Force and attended pilot training at Reese AFB in Texas.

Vietnam war

Shul served as a Foreign Air Advisor in the Vietnam War, flying 212 close air support missions in conjunction with Air America. Near the end of hostilities in 1973, his T-28 aircraft was shot down in the vicinity of the Cambodian border. Unable to eject from the aircraft, Shul was forced to crash land into the jungle. Surviving the initial impact of the crash, he suffered severe burns in the ensuing fireball. Crawling from the burning wreckage and surviving in hostile territory with extensive wounds for more than a day, he was able to find a secure location to camouflage and hide himself. Enemy patrols were still close and looking for him, with soldiers walking to within a few yards distance, although he was unsure of his judgment and thought they were hallucinations.

The rescue mission did not start immediately due to his precise location being unknown in addition to having a high number of enemy soldiers nearby and heavy jungle cover overhead. Using a combination of resources, the general area he was in was later identified and it was confirmed that no body was present at the crash site. Shul activated his radio and confirmed his identity and his general location, and an aerial search was initiated. He did not know his precise location, but he did know the approximate grid he was located within, so the search continued until his exact location was determined by him being able to see American aircraft. The only practical way to recover the injured Shul would be by helicopter; and as it would likely be under fire from the enemy, Air Force Special Operations Command Pararescue teams were selected for the operation. Although the original plan was to extract Shul quietly without the enemy noticing, the operation quickly turned into an openly hostile mission. Nearby enemy patrols were driven back by the rescue teams using small arms, while larger groups of enemies or search parties were handled with heavy weapon outfitted operators or operators acting as forward air control. Once Shul was located, the team provided immediate medical treatment to ensure that the extraction would not result in further wounds or make his existing wounds worse. Medical treatment continued aboard the evacuation helicopter and at a nearby American base.  No American casualties occurred in the operation.

Once he arrived at the military hospital in Okinawa, doctors believed he would not survive his burns. Following two months of intensive care, he flew to the Institute of Surgical Research at Fort Sam Houston, Texas. During the following year, he underwent 15 major operations. Physicians told him he'd never fly again. Months of physical therapy followed, enabling Shul to eventually pass a flight physical and return to active flying duty.

Post-Vietnam

Two days after being released from the hospital, Shul was back flying Air Force fighter jet aircraft. He went on to fly the A-7D, and was then selected to be a part of the first operational A-10 squadron at Myrtle Beach, SC, where he was on the first A-10 air show demonstration team. After a tour as an A-10 Instructor Pilot at Davis-Monthan AFB, Arizona, he went on to instruct at the Air Force's Fighter Lead-In School as the Chief of Air-to-Ground Academics. As a final assignment in his career, Shul volunteered for and was selected to fly the SR-71. This assignment required an astronaut-type physical just to qualify, and Shul passed with no waivers. Shul's comeback story, from lying near dead in the jungle of Southeast Asia to later flying the world's fastest, highest flying jet, has been the subject of numerous magazine articles. Shul also made an Air Force safety video titled "Sierra Hotel" (with the title referring to the phonetic alphabet code for the military aviator slang expletive "Shit Hot") where he described his crash ordeal in explicit detail in order to motivate other USAF pilots to be more safety conscious and teaching them how to better survive such incidents.

After 20 years and 5000 hours in fighter jets, Shul retired from the Air Force in 1990 and went on to pursue his writing and photographic interests. In addition to running his own photo studio in northern California, he has authored seven books on flying and flight photography. His first two books (Sled Driver: Flying The World's Fastest Jet and The Untouchables) are about flying the SR-71 Blackbird and give the reader a first-hand account of being in the cockpit of the world's fastest jet. Shul's third and fourth books are about America's air demonstration teams, the Navy Blue Angels, in Blue Angels: A Portrait of Gold, and the Air Force Thunderbirds, in Summer Thunder and contain aerial images from inside the formations of these teams. In 1997, Shul released his fifth book, Eagle Eyes : Action Photography from the Cutting Edge, which is a collection of his in-flight photos.

Shul has a story of the SR-71 being the end of a ground speed check over radio one-upmanship with the smug pilot of an F/A-18 Hornet.

References

External links
 
 

1948 births
Living people
United States Air Force personnel of the Vietnam War
American Vietnam War pilots
East Carolina University alumni
Aviators from Virginia
People from Quantico, Virginia
Shot-down aviators
United States Air Force officers
People from Marysville, California
Admiral Arthur W. Radford High School alumni
Military personnel from California